Ernest Bennett is a 55-year-old retired owner of a laundry chain in southern California. In 2007, he won a World Series of Poker bracelet in the $1,000 World Championship Seniors No Limit Hold'em.  One must be at least 51 years of age in order to participate in a Seniors event.  The 2007 event set a record of 1,882 entries;  this bypassed the previous record of 1,184 by more than 30 percent.

As of 2008, Bennett has tournament winnings of over $500,000.

World Series of Poker bracelets

References

American poker players
World Series of Poker bracelet winners
Living people
Year of birth missing (living people)